Hampton–Pinckney Historic District is a national historic district located at Greenville, South Carolina. It encompasses 70 contributing buildings in a residential section of Greenville.  The houses date from about 1890 to 1930, and include Italianate, Greek Revival, Queen Anne, various bungalows, and examples of Gothic Revival and Colonial Revival design, as well as vernacular forms.  The oldest house in the district is the McBee House (ca. 1835).

It was added to the National Register of Historic Places in 1977, with a boundary increase in 1982.

References

Houses on the National Register of Historic Places in South Carolina
Historic districts on the National Register of Historic Places in South Carolina
Gothic Revival architecture in South Carolina
Colonial Revival architecture in South Carolina
Italianate architecture in South Carolina
Queen Anne architecture in South Carolina
Houses in Greenville, South Carolina
National Register of Historic Places in Greenville, South Carolina
Historic districts in Greenville County, South Carolina